O'zbekiston is a station of the Tashkent Metro on Oʻzbekiston Line. It was opened on 8 December 1984 as part of the inaugural section of the line, between Alisher Navoiy and Toshkent. The station is one of the vaulted type with two underground vestibules. The station is located lamps, which are made of glass and metal in the form of a cotton boll to disclose. On the walls in the enameled ceramics shown for water, and the ceiling is decorated with ganch. At furnish used marble, granite, ceramics, ganch, metal, glass and other materials.

References

Tashkent Metro stations
Railway stations opened in 1984